Trajan the Patrician (Traianos Patrikios) was a Byzantine historian.

According to the 10th-century Suda lexicon, a patrician Trajan flourished under emperor Justinian II (r. 685–695, 705–711). Trajan wrote a chronicle, which was "very admirable" (Suda T 901). The Suda describes him as "a most faithful Christian and most Orthodox". The chronicle is commonly believed to have covered the period from the late 7th century (likely 668) to ca. 713 or 720, and was probably used by Theophanes the Confessor and Patriarch Nikephoros I of Constantinople as a common source for their own chronicles.

References 
 Cyril Mango / Roger Scott (ed.), The Chronicle of Theophanes Confessor. Byzantine and Near Eastern history AD 284–813, Oxford 1997.

7th-century births
8th-century deaths
8th-century Byzantine historians
Patricii